Papilio saharae, the  Sahara swallowtail, is a butterfly of the family Papilionidae. It is found in North Africa and Arabia.

Biology
The larva feeds on Deverra chloranthus, Deverra scopularia, Seseli varium, Ferula communis and Pycnocyla glauca.

Subspecies
Papilio saharae saharae (North Africa, Arabia)
Papilio saharae rathjensi Warnecke, 1932 (Yemen, south-western Saudi Arabia)
Papilio saharae aferpilaggi ssp. nov (Lampedusa Island)

References
Pittaway, A. R., Larsen, T. B., Clarke, C. A., Smith, C. R., Crnjar, R. & Clarke, F. M. M. 1994. Papilio saharae Oberthür, 1879, specifically distinct from Papilio machaon Linnaeus, 1758 (Lepidoptera: Papilionidae). Entomologist's Gazette 45: 223–249.
Cassar L.F.,Catania A.,Cotton A., ""A new subspecies of Papilio saharae Oberthür, 1879 (Lepidoptera: Papilionidae)from Lampedusa, Italy"
 Zootaxa 5231 (1): 065–078.

External links
Papilio saharae von J. Fuchs
Tarrantier, Maroc Butterflies

saharae
Butterflies described in 1879
Butterflies of Africa
Taxa named by Charles Oberthür